Luis Fernando Ramírez Acuña (born November 23, 1959) is a Colombian public accountant, former Defense and labor minister and Vice Presidential candidate. Ramírez led the Ministry of Defense during President Andrés Pastrana's government and had to deal with the peace process (1999-2002) between the government and the Revolutionary Armed Forces of Colombia (FARC). In May 2001 Ramirez quit his job as defense minister.
As Minister of Labor he was the leader of the Social Security Reform that introduced in Colombia the capitalizacion system run by private pension Funds.
Mr. Ramirez also served as Vice Minister of Finance and was also director of the Internal Revenue System.

References
 Lanota.com - Luis Fernando Ramirez
BBC Colombian Defense Minister resigns

Year of birth missing (living people)
People from Santander Department
Colombian Ministers of Labour and Social Protection
Colombian Ministers of Defense
New Democratic Force politicians
Living people
Jorge Tadeo Lozano University alumni
20th-century Colombian politicians
21st-century Colombian politicians